Meredith Whittaker is the President of the Signal Foundation, and serves on their Board of Directors. She was formerly the Minderoo Research Professor at New York University (NYU), and the co-founder and faculty director of the AI Now Institute. She also served as a Senior Advisor on AI to Chair Lina Khan at the Federal Trade Commission. Whittaker was employed at Google for 13 years, where she founded Google’s Open Research group and co-founded the M-Lab. In 2018, she was a core organizer of the Google Walkouts and resigned from the company in July 2019.

Early life and education 
Whittaker completed her bachelor's degree in Rhetoric at University of California, Berkeley.

Research and career 
Whittaker is the President of the Signal foundation and serves on their Board of Directors. She was formerly the Minderoo Research Professor at NYU, and the Faculty Director of NYU’s AI Now Institute. 

She joined Google in 2006. She founded Google Open Research which collaborated with the open source and academic communities on issues related to net neutrality measurement, privacy, security, and the social consequences of artificial intelligence. Whittaker was a speaker at the 2018 World Summit on AI. She has written for the American Civil Liberties Union.

Whittaker co-founded M-Lab, a globally distributed network measurement system that provides the world’s largest source of open data on internet performance. She has also worked extensively on issues of data validation, privacy, the social implications of artificial intelligence, the political economy of tech, and labor movements in the context of tech and the tech industry. She has spoken out about the need for privacy and against weakening encryption. She has advised the White House, the FCC, the FTC, the City of New York, the European Parliament, and many other governments and civil society organizations on artificial intelligence, internet policy, measurement, privacy, and security.

AI Now 
She is the Co-Founder and former Faculty Director of the AI Now Institute at NYU, a leading university institute dedicated to researching the social implications of artificial intelligence and related technologies which she started with Kate Crawford in 2017 after a symposium hosted by the White House. AI Now is partnered with the New York University Tandon School of Engineering, New York University Center for Data Science and Partnership on AI. They have produced annual reports that examine the social implications of artificial intelligence, including bias, rights and liberties.

Congressional testimony 

She has testified before Congress, including testimony to the U.S. House Committee on Science, Space & Technology on "Artificial Intelligence: Societal and Ethical Implications" in June 2019. where Whittaker pointed to research and cases showing that AI systems can entrench bias and replicate harmful patterns. She called for whistleblower protections for tech workers arguing that the centrality of tech to core social institutions, and the opacity of tech deployment, made such disclosures crucial to the public interest.

She testified to the House Oversight Committee on “Facial Recognition Technology: Ensuring Commercial Transparency & Accuracy” in January 2020. She highlighted structural issues with facial recognition and the political economy of the industry, where these technologies are used by powerful actors on less powerful actors in ways that can entrench marginalization. She made the case that ‘bias’ was not the core concern, warned against an over reliance on technical audits that could be used to justify the use of systems without tackling structural issues such as the opacity of facial recognition systems, and the power dynamics that attend their use. Her testimony also pointed to the lack of sound scientific support for some of the claims used by private vendors, and called for a halt to the use of these technologies.

Federal Trade Commission 
In November 2021, Lina Khan confirmed Whittaker joined the United States Federal Trade Commission as a Senior Advisor on Artificial Intelligence to the Chair. Once announced as Signal's President, at the beginning of September 2022, she revealed the ending of her term at the FTC.

Signal 
On September 6 2022, Whittaker announced that she would be starting on September 12 in the role of Signal’s President, "a new position created in collaboration with Signal’s leadership".

Activism 
In 2018, Whittaker was one of the core organizers of the Google Walkouts, with over 20,000 Google employees walking out internationally to protest Google's culture when it comes to claims of sexual misconduct and citizen surveillance, they released a series of demands, some of which were met by Google. 

The walkout was prompted by Google's reported $90 million pay out to Andy Rubin, who had been accused of sexual misconduct, and the company's involvement with Project Maven. More than 3,000 Google employees signed a petition against Project Maven. Project Maven consisted of a contract between the US Military and Google, in which Google was to develop machine vision technologies for the US Drone Program. Following the protests, Google did not renew the Maven contract. She was part of the movement that called for Google to rethink their AI ethics council after the appointment of Kay Coles James, the President of The Heritage Foundation who has fought against LGBT protections. Whittaker claimed that she faced retaliation from Google, and wrote in an open letter that she had been told to "abandon her work" on enforcing ethics in technology at the AI Now Institute.

In a note shared internally following her resignation, Whittaker called for tech workers to "unionize in a way that works, protect conscientious objectors and whistleblowers, demand to know what you’re working on and how it’s used, and to build solidarity with other tech workers beyond your company."

Whittaker promotes organizing within Silicon Valley and tackling sexual harassment, gender inequality and racism in tech.

Selected publications 

 Whittaker, Meredith (November - December 2021). “The Steep Cost of Capture”. Interactions, Volume 28, Issue 6. pp 50–55. https://doi.org/10.1145/3488666
 Vgontzas Nantina; Whittaker, Meredith. (January 29, 2021). “These Machines Won’t Kill Fascism: Toward a Militant Progressive Vision for Tech”. The Nation. https://www.thenation.com/article/society/tech-labor-progressive/
 Sadowski, Jathan; Viljoen, Salomé; Whittaker, Meredith. “Everyone should decide how their digital data are used — not just tech companies”. Nature (2021). https://doi.org/10.1038/d41586-021-01812-3
 Whittaker, Meredith; Alper, Meryl; Bennett, Cynthia L.; Hendren, Sara; Kaziunas, Elizabeth; Mills, Mara; Ringel Morris, Meredith; Rankin, Joy; Rogers, Emily; Salas, Marcel; West, Sarah Myers. (November 2019) "Disability, bias, and AI". AI Now Institute. https://ainowinstitute.org/disabilitybiasai-2019.html
 West, Sarah Myers; Whittaker, Meredith; Crawford, Kate. (April 2019). “Discriminating Systems: Gender, Race, and Power in AI”. AI Now Institute. https://ainowinstitute.org/Discriminatingsystems.html
 Reisman, Dillon; Schultz, Jason; Crawford, Kate; Whittaker, Meredith (April 2018). "Algorithmic impact assessments: A practical framework for public agency accountability." AI Now Institute. https://ainowinstitute.org/aiareport2018.html
 Yuste, R., Goering, S., Arcas, B. et al. "Four ethical priorities for neurotechnologies and AI." Nature (2017). https://doi.org/10.1038/551159a

References 

21st-century American businesswomen
21st-century American businesspeople
21st-century American women writers
21st-century American non-fiction writers
American social activists
American social justice activists
American social scientists
American women social scientists
Artificial intelligence researchers
Artificial intelligence ethicists
Google employees
Living people
New York University faculty
New York University fellows
UC Berkeley College of Letters and Science alumni
Philosophers of technology
Women technology writers
Year of birth missing (living people)